The Changchun–Shenzhen Expressway, designated as G25 and commonly referred to as the Changshen Expressway, is an expressway that connects the cities of Changchun, Jilin, China, and Shenzhen, Guangdong. When complete, it will be  in length.

Section from Jiande, Zhejiang to Jinhua are not constructed yet.

Tangjin Expressway

The Tangjin Expressway is an expressway and auxiliary route of the G25 in China which links Tangshan in Hebei province to Tianjin.

The Tangjin Expressway gets its name by the combination of two one-character Chinese abbreviations of both Tangshan and Tianjin (Tangshan—Tang, Tianjin—Jin).

Speed Limit
Maximum speed limit of 110 km/h.

Tolls
Approximately CNY 0.4 per kilometre.

Lanes
6 lanes (3 up, 3 down) and 4 lanes (2 up, 2 down) interchangeably.

Major Exits
Hebei Section: Tangshan
Tianjin Section: Jingjintang Expressway, Jinghu Expressway, Tianjin

Service Areas
Hebei Section: Tangshan
Tianjin Section: A service area is under projection and construction is expected at Hangu.

Connections
Jingjintang Expressway: Connects at Tanggu West

List of exits

Symbols: ↗ = exit; ⇆ = main interchange; S = service area; ¥ = central toll gate

Tianjin section 
Expressway begins at the intersection with the Jingshen Expressway
 ⇆ (Interchange with the Jingshen Expressway)
 ↗ 1: Tangshan East, Guye District
 ⇆ 2: (Interchange with the Tanggang Expressway) Kaiping District, Jinggang Port
 S Tangshan
 ↗ 3: Tangshan South, Tanghai
 ↗ 4: Fengnan District
 ⇆ 5: (Interchange with the China National Highway 205) China National Highway 205
 ¥ Tianjin/Hebei provincial boundary
 ↗ 6: Hangu Farm
 ✕ Hangu Service Area under construction
 ↗ 7: Ninghe, Lutai
 ↗ 8: Hangu District
 ↗ 9: Qinghe Farm
 ⇆ 10: (Interchange with the Jingjintang Expressway) Tianjin, Tanggu
...
Expressway ends at the Outer Ring Road (Tianjin)

References

Videos

Chinese national-level expressways
Expressways in Jilin
Expressways in Inner Mongolia
Expressways in Liaoning
Expressways in Hebei
Expressways in Tianjin
Expressways in Shandong
Expressways in Jiangsu
Expressways in Zhejiang
Expressways in Fujian
Expressways in Guangdong